Raa Raa may refer to:
 Raa Raa (2011 film), 2011 film by Sandilya
 Raa Raa (2018 film), 2018 film by Shankarand
 Raa Raa the Noisy Lion, 2011 British Animated series